Locust Grove Township may refer to the following places in the United States:
Locust Grove Township, Fremont County, Iowa
Locust Grove Township, Jefferson County, Iowa

Township name disambiguation pages